Sadanont Durongkavarojana (also known as Nont, born 6 October 2000) is a Thai actor. He is known for his main role as Phop in the film Dew (2019).

Early life and education 
Sadanont was born in Bangkok, Thailand. He completed his secondary education at Bangkok Christian College. He is currently taking up a bachelor's degree in the School of Digital Media and Cinematic Arts at Bangkok University.

Career 
Sadanont started appearing in several music videos such as "คือเธอใช่ไหม" (Keu Tur Chai Mai) by Getsunova and Tai Orathai, and "วังวน" (LOOP) by ONEONE.

He starred in the Thai romantic movie Dew, his first film, where he played the main role of Phop and was part of Bad Genius: The Series, a television series remake of the 2017 Thai film Bad Genius.

Filmography

Film

Television

Music video appearances

Awards and nominations

References

External links 
 

2000 births
Living people
Sadanont Durongkavarojana
Sadanont Durongkavarojana
Sadanont Durongkavarojana